James Cameron is a Canadian director, producer, screenwriter and editor who has received numerous accolades throughout his career.

Cameron first gained recognition for writing and directing science fiction films including The Terminator (1984), Aliens (1986), The Abyss (1989) and Terminator 2: Judgment Day (1991), for which he won various awards that honor sci-fi projects, such as the Hugo Awards, the Nebula Awards, and the Saturn Awards. In 2010, he won his fifth Saturn Award for Best Director, breaking the record for being the most awarded individual in this category.

In 1997, he wrote, directed, edited and produced the epic romance film Titanic, one of the most expensive films ever made. Released to critical acclaim and commercial success, it became the first picture to gross $1 billion at the box office. It received a record-tying fourteen nominations at the 1998 Academy Awards and became the second film in history to win eleven Oscars, with Cameron winning Best Picture, Best Director and Best Film Editing. For Titanic, he also won a Directors Guild of America Award, two Golden Globe Awards, a Producers Guild of America Award and received three nominations at the 1998 British Academy Film Awards.

In 2009, Avatar, Cameron's first feature film in twelve years, was released. It broke several box office records and on January 25, 2010, became the highest-grossing film in history. At the 2010 Academy Awards, Avatar received nine nominations, Cameron the recipient of three of them. He won Best Motion Picture – Drama and Best Director at the 2010 Golden Globe Awards, and Best Editing at the 2010 Critics' Choice Movie Awards. He received a seventh Academy Award nomination for Avatar: The Way of Water (2022), the second of the five planned films of the Avatar franchise.

Cameron has been nominated for three Primetime Emmy Awards, winning Outstanding Documentary or Nonfiction Series in 2014 for producing the Showtime documentary television series Years of Living Dangerously, and in 2021 for producing the Disney+ nature documentary series Secrets of the Whales.

Awards and nominations

Notes

References

External links
  

Cameron, James
Cameron, James
James Cameron